Short Trips – Volume 2 is a Big Finish Productions audiobook based on the long-running British science fiction television series Doctor Who.

After the Big Finish Short Trips books ended the range was restarted in talking book format, now read by actors with music and sound effects.

Notes
Unlike all the previous Short Trips audios, Letting Go is told in the first person.
The Way Forward contains multiple indirect references to the American time travel cartoon Peabody's Improbable History.

External links 
Short Trips Volume 2

Big Finish Short Trips
Doctor Who spin-offs